Winant Sidle (September 7, 1916, in Springfield, Ohio – March 15, 2005, in Southern Pines, North Carolina) was a major general in the United States Army.

Biography
Sidle was born on September 7, 1916, in Springfield, Ohio, and was raised in Lansdowne, Pennsylvania. He graduated from Hamilton College in 1938 and obtained a master's degree in journalism from the University of Wisconsin-Madison in 1949. Sidle married Anne Brown in 1942. They had five children. He died on March 15, 2005, in Southern Pines, North Carolina, and is interred with Anne at Arlington National Cemetery.

Career
Sidle originally joined the Pennsylvania Army National Guard in 1940. During World War II, he served in a number of battles, including Operation Shingle. Following the war, he joined the regular Army and served in the Korean War. During the Vietnam War, he was the Chief of Information for the Army in Saigon from 1967 to 1969 before becoming the Chief of Information for the Army from 1969 to 1973. He was Deputy Assistant Secretary of Defense for Public Affairs from 1974 until his retirement the following year.

References

1916 births
2005 deaths
United States Army personnel of World War II
United States Army personnel of the Korean War
United States Army personnel of the Vietnam War
Burials at Arlington National Cemetery
Hamilton College (New York) alumni
Military personnel from Ohio
Pennsylvania National Guard personnel
People from Delaware County, Pennsylvania
People from Springfield, Ohio
United States Army generals
University of Wisconsin–Madison School of Journalism & Mass Communication alumni